Mohamed Skander Missaoui is a Tunisian Greco-Roman wrestler. He represented Tunisia at the 2019 African Games held in Rabat, Morocco and he won the silver medal in the 87 kg event. He is also a six-time medalist at the African Wrestling Championships.

Career 

In 2021, he competed at the African & Oceania Olympic Qualification Tournament hoping to qualify for the 2020 Summer Olympics in Tokyo, Japan.

He won the silver medal in his event at the 2022 African Wrestling Championships held in El Jadida, Morocco. He competed in the 87 kg event at the 2022 Mediterranean Games held in Oran, Algeria where he was eliminated in his first match by eventual bronze medalist Noureldin Hassan of Egypt.

Achievements

References

External links 
 

Living people
Year of birth missing (living people)
Place of birth missing (living people)
Tunisian male sport wrestlers
African Games silver medalists for Tunisia
African Games medalists in wrestling
Competitors at the 2019 African Games
African Wrestling Championships medalists
Competitors at the 2022 Mediterranean Games
Mediterranean Games competitors for Tunisia
21st-century Tunisian people